Zhubin Parang is an American comedian and television writer. He is currently a producer and writer on the political satire series The Daily Show.

Early life
Parang was born in Knoxville, Tennessee on June 4, 1981, to Iranian parents. His father Masood is a professor and the associate dean of academic and student affairs at the University of Tennessee's Tickle College of Engineering. Parang attended Vanderbilt University where he was member of the Tongue 'N' Cheek improv group and Lambda Chi Alpha fraternity. After graduating in 2003 with a degree in political science and sociology, Parang earned his J.D. degree from Georgetown Law. While working as a lawyer, he continued doing improv at UCB New York. After practicing corporate law for four years, Parang decided to quit and focus on a career in comedy.

Career
His first writing job was for Jake Sasseville's Late Night Republic. In 2011, Parang received an e-mail from The Daily Show asking him to submit, which he did at the advice of Hallie Haglund. They then hired him as a staff writer under Jon Stewart. In 2015, after four years at The Daily Show, he was promoted to head writer when Trevor Noah became host. In 2018 he was promoted to producer.

Awards and honors
 2012 - Primetime Emmy Award for Outstanding Writing for a Variety Series for The Daily Show
 2015 - Primetime Emmy Award for Outstanding Writing for a Variety Series for The Daily Show
 2017 - Inducted into the Student Media Hall of Fame at Vanderbilt University

References

American television writers
Georgetown University Law Center alumni
Vanderbilt University alumni
American male comedians
21st-century American comedians
1981 births
American people of Iranian descent
Living people
Primetime Emmy Award winners
American male television writers
21st-century American screenwriters
People from Knoxville, Tennessee
21st-century American male writers
Screenwriters from Tennessee